Muraenoidei is a suborder of eels in the order Anguilliformes which contains the following three families:

 Heterenchelyidae (Mud eels)
 Myrocongridae (Thin eels)
 Muraenidae (Moray eels)

References

Eels
Ray-finned fish suborders